The Father's Curse - The Ungrateful Son is an oil on canvas painting by Jean-Baptiste Greuze, first exhibited at the Paris Salon of 1777, where it was unanimously praised by art critics such as Denis Diderot. It is now in the Louvre in Paris.

Based on Diderot's account of the 1761 Salon, the work shows a son announcing to his family that he is leaving to join the army, with his father forbidding it. The work forms a pair with Greuze's The Son Punished.

The subject 
The subject of the painting is a scene from a family drama, when the son announces to his father that he is leaving for the army and the father curses him. The Curse of the Father, part of a diptych, is associated with another painting by Greuze, The Son Punished.

References

1777 paintings
Paintings in the Louvre by French artists
Paintings by Jean-Baptiste Greuze